is the second single by Japanese group Steady & Co.; released in 2001. The name comes from a Japanese yojijukugo term that means "spring, summer, autumn, and winter".

"Shun-Ka-Shū-Tō" sampled from "Natsu No Iro wo Sagashi-ni" (夏の色を探しに) by a Japanese Band called Air.

Track listing
"Shun-Ka-Shū-Tō" (春夏秋冬) – 4:17
"Kazemakase" (風まかせ) – 3:44
"Fall Time Flow" – 4:24

References

2001 singles
Steady & Co. songs
2001 songs
Warner Music Group singles
Song articles with missing songwriters